Beverly Hills High School, usually abbreviated as Beverly or as BHHS, is the only major public high school in Beverly Hills, California. The other public high school in Beverly Hills, Moreno High School, is a small alternative school located on Beverly Hills High School's campus.

The land was previously part of the Beverly Hills Speedway board track, which was torn down in 1924. Beverly, which serves all of Beverly Hills, was founded in 1927. The original buildings were designed by Robert D. Farquhar in the French Normandy style. The school previously received income from its on-campus oil tower.

History
Beverly Hills High School was originally in the Los Angeles City High School District. On March 23, 1936, the Beverly Hills Elementary School District left the Los Angeles City High School District and formed the Beverly Hills High School District; by operation of law this became the Beverly Hills Unified School District.

Awards and recognition
During the 1999–2000 and 2004–05 school years, Beverly Hills High School was recognized with the Blue Ribbon School Award of Excellence by the United States Department of Education, the highest award an American school can receive. Newsweek ranked Beverly Hills High School as the 267th best public high school in the country.

Admissions
Most students are residents of Beverly Hills. As of 1991, the only non-resident students allowed to enroll in Beverly Hills High were employees of BHUSD, children of employees of the City of Beverly Hills, and a small number of students in the "multicultural program". Students in that program, which was financed by state funds tied to student enrollment, were required to supply their own transportation. The program accepted 30 students each year.

The program began in the 1970s in order to expose the predominately white students to other cultures. Originally, the program only admitted students who graduated from Emerson Middle School in Westwood; however, due to complaints it was taking away the best students from University High School, which Emerson feeds into, it was expanded to 11 LAUSD middle schools in 1991.

Beginning in the early 2000s, a series of governing boards began to restrict the admission of non-residents of Beverly Hills. Currently (2020), inter-district enrollment is permitted only for children of employees of the City and the School District.

Student demographics
As of 1991, 19% of the students were Iranian, and almost 20% of the students were either Asian, Black, and/or Latino. In 2008, Beverly Hills High School had 2,412 students: 70% White, 17% Asian, 5% Black, 4% Latino.

Beginning in 2010, when the Beverly Hills Unified School District adopted a basic-aid funding formula and ended its Diversity Permit program, the demographics of Beverly's student body started shifting considerably. In 2014, the student body was 72% white, 16% Asian, 6% black, and 5% Hispanic. By 2017, the high school total population had dropped to 1,482, and the demographics of enrolled students were: 73% Caucasian, 13% Asian, 8% Latino, and 3% African-American.

The student body is, as of 2008, predominantly Jewish. Many students are Iranian Americans, many of whom at the school are Persian Jewish. Due to the large number of students of Iranian origin, the school has historically scheduled a staff development day on or around Nowruz.

As of 2012, about 35% of Beverly's current student body was born outside the United States, and 41% of its students speak a first language other than English. As of 1991 home languages other than English included Mandarin Chinese, French, Hebrew, Korean, and Russian.

Some television shows, like Beverly Hills, 90210, have been criticized for not accurately portraying the student body.

Student life
The 1988 non-fiction book Hard Lessons by Michael Leahy documents the life of six Beverly seniors for a full school year. In 1984, Beverly had a 100% graduation rate but three students committed suicide. These suicides piqued Leahy's interest in Beverly, and in 1985 he began writing Hard Lessons.

Leahy had heard many stories about Beverly having intense academic pressure, substance abuse, and being a "den of hedonism." However, after speaking to Beverly students he concluded that sex and drug abuse were neither higher nor lower than at other local high schools. Beverly's social attitudes and morals were also nearly identical to these schools. Leahy did note that Beverly's academic pressure was unusually high which led to cheating and high anxiety amongst students.

In the media

Beverly has been featured in many films and TV shows, either as part of the plot or as a filming location. Many movies, including Clueless, Real Women Have Curves, Whatever It Takes, The Bachelor and the Bobby-Soxer, and It's a Wonderful Life, featured a scene in Beverly's unique "Swim Gym," perhaps the only gymnasium that has a basketball court that can split open to reveal a recreational-sized,  swimming pool. The gym in Beverly Hills High was used in the video for boy band NLT's That Girl.

The front of Beverly High was shown in a short clip of Nickelback's music video for their song "Rockstar", although it only shows the part that reads "Hills High School" (the "Beverly" portion was cut off). The school was also in the cartoon show Totally Spies!, and it was often called "Bev High" for short.
The book series The A-List follows a group of privileged teenagers and young adults from Beverly Hills, many of them who attend Beverly Hills High School and come from entertainment families and are known for their pro-activity.

Initially, the producers of the 1990s television drama Beverly Hills, 90210 wanted the show to be set at Beverly Hills High School, and the show to be filmed on Beverly's campus. The Beverly Hills school board declined both requests. So, the TV producers created the fictional "West Beverly Hills High School" (or "West Beverly") and the show was filmed at Torrance High School, in Torrance, California. "West Beverly" is a clear reference to Beverly, because Beverly's campus is located on the western border of Beverly Hills. However, the real Beverly is mentioned throughout the first three seasons of the show.

In a 2010 episode of the reality competition cooking show Hell's Kitchen, the titular restaurant hosts Beverly's prom.

The fictional school East Beverly Hills High School was in the book series The Privileged Life.

Enrollment controversies 
The Beverly Hills Unified School District has faced controversies in student enrollment, mainly regarding diversity, and more recently, legacy enrollment (alumni preference).

For many years Beverly has selected high-achieving students from twelve LAUSD middle schools on diversity permits in an attempt to increase the number of minorities enrolled. Selections have been made based on test scores, grades and writing samples. According to enrollment data for the 2006–2007 school year, however, seven out of ten students who entered the school this way were of Asian ethnicity. In April 2007, due to pressure from parents and activist Earl Ofari Hutchinson, who criticized the school for not recruiting more African-American and Latino students, Superintendent Kari McVeigh agreed to extend the application deadline until April 27, as reported in the Los Angeles Times and The Beverly Hills Courier, hoping that more students from these minority groups would seek to enroll. According to the Beverly Hills Courier (May 25, 2007), "civil rights leaders hailed the final student selections" as "an honest effort to obtain ethnic diversity."

The school board voted 3–2 in the spring of 2008 to offer the children of alumni, who live outside the district's boundaries, preference in enrollment. The intended purpose is to influence these alumni to support the school district regarding bond measure or tax issues and fund-raising. Critics protest that, while legacy preferences are long established and constitutional for institutions of higher education (colleges and universities), legacy enrollment in public schools is anti-democratic and constitutionally questionable, and subverts public education to the benefit of the wealthy.

In 2012, the school board voted not to issue new inter-district permits for the upcoming school year, which effectively shut out students who could apply for special permission to attend BHHS.

Subway tunnel underneath school
In 2008, voters approved a half-cent increase in the sales tax in order to expand the L.A. subway system. The so-called Purple Line extension would build out the subway through Beverly Hills at an estimated cost of $2.5 billion, adding 7 new subway stations. Ultimately, the new extension – called the “Subway to the Sea” – would connect downtown’s Union Station to the Pacific Ocean in Santa Monica.

The next year, Beverly Hills voters elected Lisa Korbatov to the school board, where she served as president. For 9 years, until she left office in 2018, Korbatov led the school board and Beverly Hills city officials to oppose the expansion of the subway tunnel beneath BHHS, citing worries about explosions, carcinogens from seeping fumes, and even a possible terrorist attack.

In October 2018, BHHS students protested against the plans to build the Metro Purple Line extension beneath the high school. In addition to its 2,200 students, BHHS also serves as the emergency preparedness center for the city of Beverly Hills. The city of Beverly Hills also sued the subway project in court in an effort to prevent it from building a tunnel underneath BHHS. The high school is built over an oil field (which is still active) and is located near an earthquake fault, so the city and school contended that the tunnel would pose a safety threat to students.

Despite over $15 million expended on the litigation, much of it funded from school improvement bonds, the use of which was questioned by a citizen's oversight committee, the District was ultimately unsuccessful and on May 18, 2020, Judge George H. Wu ruled in favor of the Metro that it had satisfied the requirements of the National Environmental Policy Act in documenting its choice of route.

News services
KBEV Channel 6 is a student-run television channel at BHHS that began in 1974 on Theta Cable as part of the public, educational, and government access (PEG) channels requirements for cable companies (free access by public-access television, education-access television and government-access television (GATV) entities in the community). KBEV airs a variety of programs, including the longest-running high school news program in the country, The Norman Newservice (now The Norman News). KBEV has hosted many important guests, such as Ronald Reagan, in the past.

Newspaper
Highlights, the school's newspaper, has also won numerous awards for its reporting and writing. In October 2007, Highlights won first place in the 13th annual California State University Northridge Journalism Skills Competition, with a total of seven out of twelve possible awards in news writing, feature writing, opinion writing, sports writing and photojournalism. The Highlights staff recently took home awards from the national JEA conference in St. Louis, Missouri. In April 2009, the Highlights staff ranked 3rd place among the nation in Phoenix, Arizona. In addition to regularly winning individual awards at the JEA/NSPA fall and spring conferences, Highlights placed seventh in the nation at the Minneapolis conference in November 2011.

Athletics

The Beverly Hills High School "Swim Gym" was designed by Stiles O. Clements and built in 1939 as a New Deal project. It features a basketball court that opens to reveal a -long swimming pool underneath. It is featured in Frank Capra's famous 1946 movie It's A Wonderful Life as the location of the dance. Sports including volleyball, basketball, wrestling, swimming and water polo can all be played in this facility. Beverly offers the following sports:

 Baseball
 Basketball
 Cheerleading
 Cross Country
 Dance
 Football
 Golf
 Lacrosse
 Soccer
 Softball
 Swimming
 Tennis
 Track and Field
 Volleyball
 Water Polo
 Wrestling

BHHS's stadium is a multipurpose facility that is used for football, soccer, baseball, lacrosse, and track and field.

Of the ninety football teams throughout the course of Beverly Hills High School's history, BHHS varsity football has won 12 Southern Section championships.

Performing arts
Beverly Hills High School has a Performing Arts Department that attracts casting directors, writers and producers to attend performances and to visit classes to speak with the students.

Each year around late March to early April, the school holds its annual musical performance by performing arts students. Many of these musicals are based on Broadway award-winning musicals. BHHS is also famous for its Theater Acting Workshop, where only juniors and seniors who audition get in. Nicolas Cage once enrolled in this class.

The BHHS marching band has been selected to perform at Disneyland several times in its history. The marching band has also been invited to The London New Year’s Day Parade twice in its history, the last time being 2016.

BHHS has a very successful competitive Winter Drumline, which as of June 2012 was in its second competitive season. They compete in the SCPA and WGI circuits. The BHHS Drumline has performed such shows as "A Tour of Technology: The Inner-Workings of a Computer" and "Censor State: The State, The Conceded, The Resistance".

Beverly Hills High School also has two award-winning groups, the Madrigal Singers (a chamber choir) and Minnesingers (currently an all-women's choir). Both groups have won a wide range of awards for their performances, usually at Heritage Festivals. They have traveled across the United States to well-known locales such as San Francisco, Las Vegas, New York, Chicago, Orlando, Washington, D.C. and even internationally to Mexico, France and New Zealand. Additionally, in December, both groups go Christmas caroling to raise money for their festival trips. The groups were founded by Robert Holmes, who also helped found the Idyllwild School of Music and the Arts Summer Music Festival see Idyllwild Arts Summer Program.

BHHS's Dance Company is renowned for their success in dance. They hold annual shows in January, which they practice for immediately when the school year starts. A few years ago, the Dance Company traveled to its sister school in Cannes, France, where they were invited to perform. BHHS also has a hip-hop group, AP Posse, which performs in between Dance Company numbers.

Robotics team
The Beverly Hills High School FIRST Robotics Competition team, MorTorq - Team 1515 was founded in 2004. MorTorq won the Chairman’s Award (the most prestigious award the business team can receive) in 2010, 2013, and 2019 at the Los Angeles Regional competition, and in 2014 at the Las Vegas Regional competition. The team has won two Regional events: the Oregon Regional in 2010, and the Los Angeles Regional in 2015. MorTorq has attended the FIRST Championship in 2004, 2010, 2013, 2014, 2015, 2018, and 2019. 2019 was the first time the team was selected as a member of an alliance in Championship playoffs.

Oil wells

A cluster of nineteen oil wells in a single "drilling island" on Beverly's campus can easily be seen by drivers heading west on Olympic Boulevard toward Century City. The oil wells have pumped much of the oil from under Beverly's campus, and many have been slant drilling into productive regions of the western part of the Beverly Hills Oil Field under many homes and apartment buildings in Beverly Hills for decades.

As of May 2006, the Beverly Hills High School wells were pumping out  to  a day, earning the school approximately $300,000 a year in royalties.

In the late-1990s an art studio run by two Beverly High graduates volunteered to cover the well enclosure, which at that time was solid gray in color, with individual tiles that had been painted by kids with cancer. The studio created the design and drew the lines on the tiles, but children painted the tiles in between the lines. The studio made the design rather abstract: the design consists of random shapes on different-colored backgrounds. A ceremony inaugurating the design was held in 2001.

Beverly gained more notoriety when Erin Brockovich and Ed Masry announced having filed three lawsuits in 2003 and 2004 on behalf of 25, 400, and 300 (respectively) former students who attended Beverly from the 1970s until the 1990s. In April 2003, the Texas-based lawfirm of Baron & Budd partnered with the law office of Masry & Vititoe to lend its expertise in lawsuits related to health risks of volatile chemicals. The number of actual cancer claims filed in Santa Monica was ninety-four.

The lawsuits claimed that toxic fumes from the oil wells caused the former students to develop cancer. The oil wells are very close to all of Beverly's sports facilities, including the soccer field, the football field, and the racetrack. Beverly students—not just athletes but students taking required physical education classes from the 1970s until the 1990s—were required to run near the oil wells.

The city, the school district, and the oil companies named as defendants disputed this assertion, claiming that they had conducted air quality tests with results showing that air quality is normal at the high school. In 2003, the University of Southern California Keck School of Medicine published a "Community Cancer Assessment Regarding Beverly Hills, California" which failed to support Masry's claims.

After receiving complaints about Beverly's oil installation, the region's air-quality agency investigated Venoco and in 2003 issued three Notices of Violation regarding the operation of the drilling island. The penalty settlement included requirements that Venoco maintain continuous air quality monitoring at the high school, and prevent any oilfield gas (which is primarily methane gas) from being released into the atmosphere.

On December 12, 2006, the first 12 plaintiffs (of over 1000 total) were dismissed on summary judgment because there was no indication that the contaminant (benzene) caused the diseases involved and the concentrations were hundreds to thousands of times lower than levels associated with any risk. In the fall of 2007, the plaintiffs agreed to pay the School District and the City up to $450,000 for expenses from the lawsuits. This payment of expenses is without prejudice to any of the plaintiffs in the case, which is on appeal.

In June 2004 Beverly Hills Courier Editor Norma Zager was named "Journalist of the Year" in the Los Angeles Press Club's Southern California Journalism Awards competition for her coverage of the Erin Brockovich-Ed Masry lawsuit. Two books about the oil wells and lawsuit have been published, Parts Per Million: The Poisoning of Beverly Hills High School by Joy Horowitz was published in July 2007 and Erin Brockovich and the Beverly Hills: Greenscam by Norma Zager was published in October 2010.

In 2017, Venoco filed bankruptcy and was liquidated. By January 2021 the oil wells were plugged and capped, and the derricks had been demolished.

Notable alumni

BHHS has a number of famous alumni, many of whom are entertainers, the children of entertainers or other prominent people. In addition, many notable people have taught at the school; soap opera actor John Ingle taught the drama and acting program at the school from 1964 to 1985. While Beverly Hills High School alumni are known predominantly for their connections with the entertainment industry, BHHS has also produced well-known scholars in many scientific disciplines.

 Jack Abramoff (born 1959), convicted felon, political activist and businessman, central figure in high-profile political scandals.
 Christian Alexander (born 1990), actor
 Desi Arnaz Jr. (born 1953), actor and musician, the son of Lucille Ball and Desi Arnaz
 Lucie Arnaz (born 1951), actress, singer and producer, the daughter of Lucille Ball and Desi Arnaz
 David Ascalon (born 1945, class of 1963), sculptor
 Lloyd Avery II (1969–2005), actor
 Jon Robin Baitz (born 1961), screenwriter, producer
 Al Barry (born 1930), professional football player
 Julie Bennett (1932–2020), actress and voice actress
 Corbin Bernsen (born 1954), actor
 Jonny Blu (born 1980), singer, songwriter, pop star in China
 Jacqueline Briskin (1927–2014), author
 Albert Brooks (born 1947), actor, director
 Corey Brunish (born 1955) Three time Tony award winning producer.
 Michael John Burkett (born 1967), punk musician bassist for NOFX
 Steve Burton (born 1970), actor, appeared in General Hospital
 Nicolas Cage (born 1964), actor
 Shaun Cassidy (born 1958), actor and singer
 Richard Chamberlain (born 1934), actor
 Liz Claman (born 1963), reporter
 Jackie Cooper (1922–2011), actor and director
 Roger Corman (born 1926), director and producer
 Rick Cunningham (born 1967), professional football player
 Jamie Lee Curtis (born 1958), actress
 Charlotte D'Alessio (born 1998), Canadian model
 Elizabeth Daily (born 1961), voice actress and musician
 Bryan Dattilo (born 1971), actor
 Barry Diller (born 1942), businessman, husband of Diane von Furstenberg
 Frank Drew (born 1930), Brigadier General
 Richard Dreyfuss (born 1947), actor
 Nora Ephron (1941–2012), film director and producer
 Travis Fine (born 1968), actor, director and screenwriter
 Carrie Fisher (1956–2016), actress, author
 Joely Fisher (born 1967), actress
 Todd Fisher (born 1958), actor, director, cinematographer, architect, and museum director
 Tricia Leigh Fisher (born 1968), actress, singer
 Josh Flagg (born 1985), realtor, star of Million Dollar Listing
 Herbert Flam (1928–1980), tennis player (ranked as high as world #4)
 Rhonda Fleming (1923–2020), actress
 Michèle Flournoy (born 1960), Under Secretary of Defense for Policy
 Allen Fox (born 1939), tennis player (ranked as high as US #4) and coach
 Bonnie Franklin (1944–2013), actress
 Mike Franks (born 1936), tennis player (ranked as high as US #7)
 Toby Freedman (born 1924), All Conference Football player 1940, Space Medicine at North American Aviation and doctor for Rams and Lakers
 Daniel Fried (born 1952), American diplomat
 Nolan Frizzelle (1921-2013), California State Assemblymember (1980–1992)
 Ronald M. George (born 1941), Chief Justice of California (1996–2011)
 Gina Gershon (born 1962), actress
 Crispin Glover (born 1964), actor, director
 Jonathan Gold (1960–2018), food critic
 Randall Grahm (born 1953), winemaker, founder of Bonny Doon Vineyard, and widely known as the "Rhone Ranger".
 Josh E. Gross (born 1973), publisher of Beverly Hills Weekly
 Raymond Gutierrez and Richard Gutierrez, twins, actors
 Jeffrey Ross Gunter (born 1961), United States Ambassador to the Republic of Iceland
 Ken Harvey, professional baseball player (Kansas City Royals)
 Jay Jennings (born 1965), writer, director
 Angelina Jolie (born 1975), actress, director
 Daryn Kagan (born 1963), reporter
 Ryan Karp (born 1970), professional baseball player (Philadelphia Phillies)
 Julie Kavner (born 1950), actress
 Michael Klesic (born 1975), actor
 Andrew Kline, (born 1976), American football player
 Ronnie Knox (born 1935), professional football player
 Jenji Kohan (born 1969), TV writer, producer, creator of Weeds
 Tony Krantz (born 1959), TV producer, 24
 Lenny Kravitz (born 1964), singer-songwriter
 Christopher B. Landon (born 1975), screenwriter
 Katherine Kelly Lang (born 1961), actress, The Bold and the Beautiful
 Serge Lang (1927–2005), mathematician
 Logan Lerman (born 1992), actor
 Mel Levine (born 1942), Congressman (1982–1992)
 Monica Lewinsky (born 1973), noted for relationship with Bill Clinton, (not a BHHS graduate – transferred to Pacific Hills School)
 Louise Lieberman (born 1977), soccer coach and former player
 Amy Linker (born 1966), actress
 Gabriel Macht (born 1972), actor, Suits
 Mackenyu (born 1996), Japanese actor
 Stacy Margolin (born 1959), tennis player
 Alejandro Mayorkas (born 1959), United States Secretary of Homeland Security
 Leighton Meester (born 1986), actress
 Erik Menendez (born 1970), convicted murderer who was subjected in a highly publicized trial in 1993 alongside his brother, Lyle, for the 1989 killings of their parents.
 Breckin Meyer (born 1974), actor
 Romeo Miller (born 1989), rapper, basketball player
 Frank Morriss (1927–2013), film and TV editor
 Camila Morrone (born 1997), model and actress
 Leland Moss (1948–1990), theatre director 
 Sam Nazarian, (born 1975), businessman
 Laraine Newman (born 1952), actress, comedian
 Georg Olden (born 1968), actor
 Guy Oseary, manager for Madonna and U2
 Elinor Ostrom, Ph.D. (1933–2012), winner of 2009 Nobel Prize in Economics
 Holly Palance (born 1950), actress, daughter of the actor Jack Palance
 Ira Pauly (born 1930), football player and psychiatrist
 Spencer Paysinger (born 1988), professional football player
 Ariel Pink (Ariel Marcus Rosenberg) (born 1978), musician
 Mason Porter (born 1976), mathematician and physicist
 Jim Powers (1928–2013), professional football player
 André Previn (1929–2019), pianist, composer
 Rain Pryor (born 1969), actress, comedian; daughter of Richard Pryor
 Max Rafferty (1917–1982), author, educator, politician
 Edwin Reinecke (1924–2016), politician
 Rob Reiner (born 1947), actor, director; son of Carl Reiner
 Antonio Sabato Jr. (born 1972), actor
 Peter Schiff (born 1963), author, entrepreneur, financial commentator
 Alan Schom (born 1937), historian and biographer
 David Schwimmer (born 1966), actor
 Richard M. Sherman (born 1928), composer
 Robert B. Sherman (1925–2012), composer
 Pauly Shore (born 1968), actor, comedian
 Sanford C. Sigoloff (1930–2011), businessman
 Cathy Silvers (born 1961), actress
 Jonathan Silverman (born 1966), actor
 Sam Simon (1955–2015), cartoonist, screenwriter, showrunner
Mona Simpson, novelist, English professor, and biological sister of Steve Jobs
 Slash (born 1965) guitarist Saul Hudson
 James G. Snitzer (1926–1945), actor, soldier
 Bahar Soomekh (born 1975), actress
 Candy Spelling (born 1945), author, TV personality
 Tori Spelling (born 1973), actress, TV personality, author
 Amber Stevens West (born 1986), actress
 Joanna Stingray (born 1960), Soviet-era rock and roll performer
 Walter J. Stoessel Jr. (1920–1986), American diplomat.
 Maria Tallchief (1925–2013), prima ballerina
 Tiger JK (born 1974) lead hip-hop rapper of Drunken Tiger
 Michael Tolkin (born 1950), filmmaker and novelist
 Peter Tomarken (1942–2006), game show host
 Tracy Tormé (born 1959), screenwriter
 Edward Tufte (born 1942), specialist in interface design
 Jean Vander Pyl (1919–1999), actress and voice actress
Lawrence Vavra “LV” (born 1977), Entrepreneur, Investor most known for founding Deckstar
 Milana Vayntrub (born 1987), actress most famous for being "Lily" in AT&T commercials
 Katie Wagner (born 1964), reporter
 Jon Weinbach (born 1976), film and television producer
 Betty White (1922–2021), actress, comedian
 Frank Wilkinson (1914–2006), civil liberties activist
 Kelli Williams (born 1970), actress
 Wally Wolf (1930–1997), swimmer, water polo player, and Olympic champion
 James Yenbamroong (born 1984), space techpreneur
 Daniel Yergin (born 1947), author and economics researcher; works include The Prize: The Epic Quest for Oil, Money, and Power.

References

External links 

 Beverly Hills High School
 Beverly Hills Unified School District homepage
 National Center for Education Statistics: Beverly Hills Unified School District

 
Buildings and structures in Beverly Hills, California
Educational institutions established in 1927
High schools in Los Angeles County, California
Public high schools in California
1927 establishments in California